An earthquake occurred northeast of the city of Adana on 14 May 1269 at "the first hour of the night". Most sources give a death toll of 8,000 in the Armenian Kingdom of Cilicia in southern Asia Minor, but a figure of 60,000  dead was reported by Robert Mallet in 1853 and repeated in many later catalogues.

References

1268
13th century in the Middle East
13th-century earthquakes
Late Medieval Anatolia
1268
1268 in Asia